Jacob van Langren (c. 1525 – 27 July 1610) was a Dutch cartographer and globe-maker who established a family dynasty of three generations in those professions. He was born in Gelderland but moved to the Southern Netherlands and later to Amsterdam, where his sons Arnold and Hendrik were born. From about 1586 Jacob and his son Arnold produced globes, both terrestrial and celestial, the first ever produced in the northern Low Countries. Over the next fifty years, the van Langrens continued to revise and improve their engravings; Petrus Plancius collaborated on the 1589 edition. In 1592, the States General granted the Van Langren family a monopoly in the production of globes, which led to quarrels with Jodocus Hondius. Jacob died in Alkmaar in 1610, where he is buried in the Grote Kerk.

His grandson Michael van Langren was also a cartographer.

Notes

References

1520s births
1610 deaths
16th-century Dutch cartographers
17th-century Dutch cartographers
People from Gelderland